The International Association for Business and Society (IABS) is a non-profit organization devoted to research and teaching about the relationships between business, government and society. Established in 1990, IABS sponsors a scholarly journal, Business and Society, publishes a newsletter, hosts an annual conference, and publishes an annual conference proceeding. IABS members receive the journal, the newsletter, and the conference proceeding as benefits of membership.

Publications of the International Association for Business and Society
 Business and Society (SAGE Publications)
 International Association for Business and Society Newsletter, 1992–present
 Proceedings of the International Association for Business and Society, 1990–present

Annual meetings
Meetings of the International Association for Business and Society Society are held annually in a different location. IABS conferences have been held in the US, Canada, Mexico, Austria, Finland, France, Italy, The Netherlands, and United Kingdom, reflecting the organizations international character.

External links

 Business and Society
 International Association for Business and Society Newsletter
 Proceedings of the International Association for Business and Society

Business ethics organizations
Learned societies of the United States
Organizations established in 1990